Phases of Matter is a 2020 documentary directed by Deniz Tortum about the Cerrahpaşa Hospital in Istanbul, Turkey. It premiered at the International Film Festival Rotterdam in 2020, and won the Best Documentary Award in Both Antalya Golden Orange Film Festival and Istanbul International Film Festival.

Plot 

Phases of Matter follows the day-to-day lives of various workers, such as surgeons, trainees, nurses, and imams at Istanbul's Cerrahpaşa Hospital.

Awards and nominations

Reception 
On the film aggregator Rotten Tomatoes, the film holds an approval rating of 100%.

Peter Keough of Boston Globe wrote "Had Frederick Wiseman’s ‘Hospital’ wandered into Lars von Trier's ‘The Kingdom’ the unlikely result might have resembled Deniz Tortum's haunting and hypnotic Phases of Matter," while in his critique on Reverse Shot, James Wham wrote "We feel the hospital’s heartbeat; we hear this organism breathe."

References 

2020 films
2020 documentary films
Turkish documentary films